Of Ghosts and Gods is the twelfth studio album by the Canadian death metal band Kataklysm. It was released on 31 July 2015.

Track listing

Credits

Personnel
 Maurizio Iacono - vocals
 Jean-François Dagenais - guitar
 Stephane Barbe - bass guitar
 Oli Beaudoin - drums

Production
 Andy Sneap - mixing, mastering

Charts

Notes
A music video has been made for every track on the album.

References

External links
Of Ghosts and Gods at Metal-archive.com

2015 albums
Kataklysm albums
Nuclear Blast albums
Juno Award for Heavy Metal Album of the Year albums